Kees Torn (born 1967 in Oostburg) is a Dutch text writer and comedy performer.

Career
Torn started his cabaret performance in 1991, when he was studying at the Willem de Kooning Academy in Rotterdam. As "Kees en Ik" (Kees and I), he performed quite a successful show with fellow student Gerrie Hondius. In 1994 he made his official solo-debut with the show "Laat maar laaien". Torn is known for his old fashioned style of comedy performance, which consists largely of songs and poems. Torn prefers to write about whisky, cigars and love.

Prizes and nominations 
 1991: "Groningen Studentencabaret Festival": personality prize (Kees & Ik)
 1994: "Leids Cabaret Festival": jury- and audience-prize
 1996: "Werftheaterprijs"
 1997: Conamus-supportprize
 1999: Annie M.G. Schmidtprize
 2005: Nominated for "Neerlands Hoop"
 2007: Won VSCD Poelifinario 2006-2007

Shows 
 1995: Laat maar laaien
 1996: Als ik het niet dacht
 1998: Plek Zat (Room enough)
 2001: Mooie boel (Nice mess)
 2002: In de gloria
 2004: Doe mee en win
 2006: Dood en verderf (Death and destruction)
 2009: Einde verhaal (End of story)
 2010-2011: Loze kreten
 2016: Eraf met dat dak

References

1967 births
Living people
Dutch male comedians
Dutch cabaret performers
People from Sluis
Willem de Kooning Academy alumni